, AKA Affairs Within Walls and Skeleton in the Closet, is a 1965 Japanese pink film written and directed by Kōji Wakamatsu. It was one of the first pink films to be shown outside Japan when it was entered into the 15th Berlin International Film Festival.

Cast

References

External links

 

1965 films
1960s pornographic films
Japanese black-and-white films
1960s Japanese-language films
Films directed by Kōji Wakamatsu
Pink films
1960s Japanese films